The 1994 Ms. Olympia contest was an IFBB professional bodybuilding competition was held on September 9, 1994, in Atlanta, Georgia. It was the 15th Ms. Olympia competition held. It was held in conjunction with the 1994 Mr. Olympia and Masters Olympia.

Results

See also
 1994 Mr. Olympia

References

 1994 Ms Olympia Results
 1994 Ms. Olympia held in Atlanta on September 9th
 1994 Ms Olympia Gallery

External links
 Competitor History of the Ms. Olympia

Ms Olympia, 1994
1994 in bodybuilding
Ms. Olympia
Ms. Olympia
History of female bodybuilding